Jean-Claude Turcotte (26 June 1936 – 8 April 2015) was a Canadian Roman Catholic cardinal. Upon his elevation into the cardinalate he was made the Cardinal-Priest of Our Lady of the Blessed Sacrament and the Holy Canadian Martyrs. He was the Archbishop of the Roman Catholic Archdiocese of Montreal from 1990 to 2012, and was succeeded as Archbishop by Christian Lépine.

Biography

Early life and priesthood
Jean-Claude Turcotte was born on 26 June 1936 as one of seven children to Paul-Émile Turcotte. Turcotte attended Collège André-Grasset from 1947 to 1955, the Grand Séminaire and the Université de Montréal, where he graduated with a degree in theology.

He was ordained as a priest on 24 May 1959 after the completion of his studies for the priesthood. He went to Lille for further studies from 1964 to 1965. In 1965 he earned a diploma in social ministry in Lille, France.

Episcopate
On 14 April 1982, his appointment as  the Titular Bishop of Suas (a titular see in what is now Tunisia) and Auxiliary Bishop of Montreal was announced. He was consecrated on 29 June that year in the cathedral of Montreal. When Pope John Paul II visited Canada in 1984, Turcotte organized his visit to Montreal.

Cardinalate
Turcotte was appointed Archbishop of Montreal on 17 March 1990. John Paul II appointed him a Cardinal-Priest of the titular church of Nostra Signora del SS. Sacramento e Santi Martiri Canadesi in the consistory on 26 November 1994.

After his elevation to the cardinalate, he was appointed to several departments of the Roman Curia:
Congregation for the Causes of Saints
Congregation for the Evangelization of Peoples
Pontifical Council for Social Communications

From 1997 to 1999, he served as the president of the Canadian Episcopal Conference. Cardinal Turcotte participated in the 1993, 1997, 2000, and 2002 World Youth Days.

Cardinal Turcotte was known for his work with the poor and wrote a weekly religion column in the Sunday edition of the Journal de Montréal. In 1997, he gave his opinion about Quebec being a distinct society.

He was a voting member (cardinal elector) of the College of Cardinals in the 2005 papal conclave. Margaret Hebblethwaite, co-author of the book The Next Pope, identified him as papabile. Other books and the BBC also identified him as a long-shot possibility for Pope.

He was one of the cardinal electors who participated in the 2013 papal conclave that elected Pope Francis.

Nicole Fournier, who led the Accueil Bonneau organization for the homeless, said that he "watched over people with a look that was never judgmental, ... (and) supported many social causes, especially those touching the less fortunate, notably the homeless." John Allen wrote in the 2002 book Conclave that Turcotte was seen as a "diamond in the rough, a potentially magnificent leader who is still finding his way." His lack of proficiency in the Italian language, as well as his lack of international experience, were seen as shortcomings.

Death
Turcotte died at the age of 78 in Montreal on 8 April 2015.

Views

Abortion
In 2007, Turcotte presided over the funeral of Supreme Court judge Antonio Lamer, who controversially decided to remove all restrictions to abortion in Tremblay v. Daigle in 1989. At the funeral, Turcotte praised Lamer as "a giant of the law" and a man "who worked a great deal for justice". He was not, however, directly addressing the subject of abortion when he spoke those words.

On 11 September 2008, Turcotte returned his Order of Canada (appointed in 1996) insignia in protest of the induction of pro-choice activist Henry Morgentaler on 1 July 2008. Turcotte had hoped that the Consultative Council for the Order of Canada, but when it did not, Turcotte renounced his title Officer of the Order of Canada and returned his insignia. This became effective on 1 June 2009.

In 2009, Turcotte said in an interview that "I can understand that in certain cases, there is almost no other choice than to practice (abortion)", which was seen as controversial in light of his previous condemnation of Morgentaler.

Political ties
In 2004, he criticized statements by former minister Sheila Copps about Turcotte's relationship with Pierre Trudeau. He had been present at the state funeral of the former Prime Minister.

Women's ordination
Turcotte refused to accept the ordination of women after a local synod proposed the idea.

Brian Boucher controversy
On 25 November 2020, a report was released detailing how a Catholic church-commissioned investigation led by Quebec Superior Court justice Pepita Capriolo found that Turcotte was among the former Archdiocese of Montreal officials who took no action against pedophile priest Brian Boucher after receiving reports Boucher sexually abused boys. Boucher later pled guilty in January 2019 to sex abuse charges and received an eight-year prison sentence.

References

External links
 Cardinal Turcotte on catholic-pages.com
 Cardinal Turcotte on catholic-hierarchy.org
Qui succédera à Jean-Paul II?  (Le Canal Nouvelles, 2 April 2005; in French)
 John L. Allen Jr., Conclave: The Politics, Personalities, and Process of the Next Papal Election 
 "Declaration by Cardinal Jean-Claude Turcotte, Archbishop of Montreal", 

2015 deaths
1936 births
Roman Catholic archbishops of Montreal
Canadian cardinals
Canadian columnists
Cardinals created by Pope John Paul II
Members of the Pontifical Council for Social Communications
Members of the Congregation for the Causes of Saints